Park Seung-ok (born 28 January 1938) is a South Korean former footballer who competed in the 1964 Summer Olympics.

References

External links
 
 

1938 births
Living people
South Korean footballers
Olympic footballers of South Korea
Footballers at the 1964 Summer Olympics
Asian Games medalists in football
Footballers at the 1962 Asian Games
Kyung Hee University alumni
People from Incheon
1964 AFC Asian Cup players
Asian Games silver medalists for South Korea
Association football defenders
Medalists at the 1962 Asian Games